Pellat (or Pelat) may refer to:

People with the surname
Alexis Pelat (1902-1962), a.k.a. Alexis Pellat, French politician. 
Charles Pellat (1914-1992), French Arabist.
Patrice Pellat-Finet (born 1952), French alpine skier.

Locations
Mont Pelat, a mountain in the Alps.